Skittish was released in the year 2000 by Mike Doughty, his first solo album. The album was recorded in one day only on July 5, 1996, with indie rock producer Kramer and mixed on July 6. Doughty was still the front man for the indie rock band Soul Coughing, several days before the release of the Soul Coughing album Irresistible Bliss. Some of the songs on the album had been intended as Soul Coughing songs, but were rejected by the other band members. The CD was first released with a limited run of 200, which was signed by him and contained a written “Fake Word” on the track list. This limited CD was an online purchase directly from him.

Though Kramer built up some songs in Doughty's absence, with strings and organ, the disc is mostly a stark affair. Doughty's riffs—often using a guitar rhythm Doughty calls the "gangadank"—punctuate emotional lyrics on songs such as "The Only Answer" and "The Pink Life". It was extremely different from Soul Coughing, and confused by the sonic departure, his label, Warner Bros., rejected it.

Though the album was not officially released, versions of the songs, often featuring extra instruments as experimental mixes, ended up on Napster as The Skittish Sessions. When Doughty quit Soul Coughing in 2000 and began touring as a one-man act, he was surprised to find audiences singing along to the songs. He quickly printed up white label versions of the CD and sold them himself at the gigs, selling 20,000, mostly by hand at the front of the stage after the shows.

Skittish finally got an official release in 2004 as part of the double album Skittish / Rockity Roll, which also includes Doughty's electro EP Rockity Roll.

Track listing
All songs written and performed by Mike Doughty unless otherwise noted.
 "The Only Answer" – 2:09
 "The Pink Life" – 2:59
 "Real Love"/"It's Only Life" (medley; Mary J. Blige/The Feelies covers) – 3:11
 "No Peace Los Angeles" – 3:32
 "Where Have You Gone?" – 3:12
 "Thank You, Lord, For Sending Me the F Train" – 2:43
 "Looks" (Student Teachers cover) – 2:57
 "Shunned + Falsified" – 2:42
 "All the Dirt" – 2:34
 "Sweet Lord in Heaven" – 1:44
 "Language Barrier" – 2:13
 "Rising Sign" – 2:20

The Skittish Sessions
All songs are different from the versions on the released Skittish.

 "The Pink Life"
 "Real Love/It's Only Life" (medley; Mary J. Blige/ The Feelies)
 "No Peace Los Angeles"
 "Mean Curl" *
 "Where Have You Gone?"
 "All the Dirt"
 "Unluckier (I Yearn)" *
 "World of Suck" *
 "Shunned & Falsified"
 "Skittish" *
 "Thank You, Lord, For Sending Me The F Train"
 "Mr. Bitterness" *
 "Laundrytown *
 "Looks" (Student Teachers cover)
 "Rising Sign"
 "Misery Bloom (I Failed to Use It)" *
 "Cobain's Sarcoma (Sweet Lord in Heaven)"
 "Language Barrier"

tracks with * indicate that they are unreleased tracks that were not featured on Skittish. However, "Laundrytown" and "I Failed to Use It" were later remastered and released on Skittish / Rockity Roll.

References

2000 albums
Mike Doughty albums
Albums produced by Kramer (musician)